The Murder of Roger Ackroyd is a work of detective fiction by British writer Agatha Christie, first published in June 1926 in the United Kingdom by William Collins, Sons and in the United States by Dodd, Mead and Company. It is the third novel to feature Hercule Poirot as the lead detective.

Poirot retires to a village near the home of a friend, Roger Ackroyd, to pursue a project to perfect vegetable marrows. Soon after, Ackroyd is murdered and Poirot must come out of retirement to solve the case.

The novel was well-received from its first publication. In 2013, the British Crime Writers' Association voted it the best crime novel ever. It is one of Christie's best known and most controversial novels, its innovative twist ending having a significant impact on the genre. Howard Haycraft included it in his list of the most influential crime novels ever written. The short biography of Christie which is included in 21st century UK printings of her books calls it her masterpiece.

Plot summary
The book's narrator, Dr James Sheppard, introduces himself and explains these are his memoirs of a murder which happened in his town. 

In King's Abbot, wealthy widow Mrs Ferrars unexpectedly commits suicide, distressing her fiancé the widower Roger Ackroyd. At dinner that evening in Ackroyd's home of Fernly Park, his guests include his sister-in-law Mrs Cecil Ackroyd and her daughter Flora, big-game hunter Major Blunt, Ackroyd's personal secretary Geoffrey Raymond, and Dr James Sheppard, whom Ackroyd invited earlier that day. During dinner, Flora announces her engagement to Ackroyd's stepson, Ralph Paton. After dinner, Ackroyd reveals to Sheppard in his study that Mrs Ferrars had confided in him that she was being blackmailed over the murder of her husband. He then asks Sheppard to leave, wishing to read a letter from Mrs Ferrars that arrives in the post, containing her suicide note. Once home, Sheppard receives a call and leaves for Fernly Park again, after informing his sister that Parker, Ackroyd's butler, has found Ackroyd murdered. But when Sheppard arrives at Fernly Park, Parker denies making such a call; yet he, Sheppard, Raymond, and Blunt find Ackroyd dead in his study, stabbed to death with a weapon from his collection.

Hercule Poirot, living in the village, comes out of retirement at Flora's request. She does not believe Paton killed Ackroyd, despite him disappearing and police finding his footprints on the study's window. Poirot learns a few important facts on the case: all in the household, except parlourmaid Ursula Bourne, have alibis for the murder;  while Raymond and Blunt heard Ackroyd talking to someone after Sheppard left, Flora was the last to see him that evening; Sheppard met a stranger on his way home, at Fernly Park's gates; Ackroyd met a representative of a dictaphone company a few days earlier; Parker recalls seeing a chair that had been in an odd position in the study when the body was found, that has since returned to its original position; the letter from Mrs Ferrars has disappeared since the murder. Poirot asks Sheppard for the exact time he met his stranger. He later finds a goose quill and a scrap of starched cambric in the summer house, and a ring with the inscription "From R" in a goldfish pond in the gardens.

Raymond and Mrs Ackroyd later reveal they are in debt, but Ackroyd's death will resolve this as they stood to gain from his will. Flora admits she never saw her uncle after dinner; she was taking money from his bedroom. Her revelation throws doubts on everyone's alibis, and leaves Raymond and Blunt as the last people to hear Ackroyd alive. Blunt reveals he is secretly in love with Flora. Poirot calls a second meeting, adding Parker, the butler; Miss Russell, the housekeeper; and Ralph Paton, whom he had found. He reveals that the goose quill is a heroin holder belonging to Miss Russell's illegitimate son, the stranger whom Sheppard met on the night of the murder. He also informs everyone that Ursula secretly married Paton, as the ring he found was hers; it was discarded after Paton chastised her for informing his uncle of this fact, which had led to the termination of her employment. Poirot then proceeds to inform all that he knows the killer's identity, confirmed by a telegram received during the meeting. He does not reveal the name; instead he issues a warning to the killer. When Poirot is alone with Sheppard, he reveals that he knows him to be Ackroyd's killer.

Sheppard was Mrs Ferrars' blackmailer and murdered Ackroyd to stop him knowing this; he suspected her suicide note would mention this fact, and so he took it after the murder. He then used a dictaphone Ackroyd had, to make it appear he was still alive when he departed, before looping back to the study's window to plant Paton's footprints; Poirot had noted an inconsistency in the time he mentioned for the meeting at the gates. As he wanted to be on the scene when Ackroyd's body was found, he asked a patient earlier in the day to call him some time after the murder, so as to have an excuse for returning to Fernly Park; Poirot's telegram confirmed this. When no-one was around in the study, Sheppard removed the dictaphone, and returned the chair that concealed it from view to its original place. Poirot tells Sheppard that all this information will be reported to the police in the morning but suggests that Sheppard take his own life to spare his sister Caroline from finding out the truth. Dr Sheppard continues writing his report on Poirot's investigation (the novel itself), admitting his guilt and wishing his account was that of Poirot's failure to solve Ackroyd's murder. The novel's epilogue serves as his suicide note.

Characters
 Hercule Poirot –  retired from his role as a private detective, but resumes his profession when requested to assist in the investigation. He is a friend of the victim.
 Dr James Sheppard – the local doctor, Poirot's assistant in his investigations, and the novel's narrator.
 Inspector Davis – local inspector for King's Abbot and the investigating officer.
 Inspector Raglan – Police Inspector from the nearby larger town of Cranchester.
 Colonel Melrose – Chief constable for the county.
 Roger Ackroyd – the victim of the case. A wealthy businessman and widower, who is distressed by the recent death of the woman he wished to marry, Mrs Ferrars.
 Mrs Ferrars – a widow who was rumoured to have poisoned her husband Ashley Ferrars, a mean alcoholic. Commits suicide at the start of the novel.
 Mrs Cecil Ackroyd – widow of Roger's brother Cecil. She and her daughter have been living at Fernly Park for the past two years and are financially dependent on Roger. 
 Flora Ackroyd – Ackroyd's niece, Cecil's daughter. Requests Poirot's help to investigate her uncle's murder. She is engaged to Ralph at her uncle's request, unaware her fiancé has already married Ursula Bourne.
 Captain Ralph Paton – Ackroyd's stepson from his late wife's previous marriage; referred to sometimes as his "adopted" son. Secretly married to Ursula Bourne, and the police's prime suspect in the murder.
 Major Hector Blunt – Ackroyd's friend, a big game hunter, a guest of the household. He is secretly in love with Flora. Present when the body was found.
 Geoffrey Raymond – Ackroyd's secretary, a young and energetic man in his profession. Present when his employer's body was found.
 John Parker – Ackroyd's butler. Claims to have not called out Sheppard to Fernly Park, the night of Ackroyd's murder; is present when the body was found.
 Elizabeth Russell – Ackroyd's housekeeper. An attractive woman for her age.
 Ursula Bourne – Ackroyd's parlourmaid. A lady of nobility forced into service through poverty. She is secretly married to Ralph and is fired when she tells Ackroyd of this.
 Charles Kent – Russell's illegitimate son. A drug addict, recently arrived from Canada. He is encountered at Fernly Park's gates by Sheppard on the night of the murder.
 Caroline Sheppard – Dr Sheppard's older, spinster sister. She has a notable gift of staying informed on all activities in the village.
 Mrs Folliott - Ursula's older sister, but concealed this fact when providing references for her to become a parlourmaid of Ackroyd's.
 Mr Hammond – Ackroyd's lawyer.
 Ship steward – an out-of-town, unknown male patient of Dr Sheppard. Later found to have made a telephone call to him from the local train station, which Poirot confirms by a telegram received from their ship.

Narrative voice and structure

The book is set in the fictional village of King's Abbot, England. It is narrated by Dr James Sheppard, who becomes Poirot's assistant, in place of Captain Hastings who has married and settled in the Argentine. The novel includes an unexpected plot twist in the final chapter, wherein Dr Sheppard reveals he was an unreliable narrator, using literary techniques to conceal his guilt without writing anything untrue (e.g., "I did what little had to be done" at the point where he hid the dictaphone and moved the chair).

Literary significance and reception
The review in the Times Literary Supplement began, "This is a well-written detective story of which the only criticism might perhaps be that there are too many curious incidents not really connected with the crime which have to be elucidated before the true criminal can be discovered". The review concluded, "It is all very puzzling, but the great Hercule Poirot, a retired Belgian detective, solves the mystery. It may safely be asserted that very few readers will do so."

A long review in The New York Times Book Review, read in part:

The Observer had high praise for the novel, especially the character Caroline:
No one is more adroit than Miss Christie in the manipulation of false clues and irrelevances and red herrings; and The Murder of Roger Ackroyd makes breathless reading from first to the unexpected last. It is unfortunate that in two important points – the nature of the solution and the use of the telephone – Miss Christie has been anticipated by another recent novel: the truth is that this particular field is getting so well ploughed that it is hard to find a virgin patch anywhere. But Miss Christie's story is distinguished from most of its class by its coherence, its reasonableness, and the fact that the characters live and move and have their being: the gossip-loving Caroline would be an acquisition to any novel.

The Scotsman found the plot to be clever and original:
When in the last dozen pages of Miss Christie's detective novel, the answer comes to the question, "Who killed Roger Ackroyd?" the reader will feel that he has been fairly, or unfairly, sold up. Up till then he has been kept balancing in his mind from chapter to chapter the probabilities for or against the eight or nine persons at whom suspicion points.... Everybody in the story appears to have a secret of his or her own hidden up the sleeve, the production of which is imperative in fitting into place the pieces in the jigsaw puzzle; and in the end it turns out that the Doctor himself is responsible for the largest bit of reticence. The tale may be recommended as one of the cleverest and most original of its kind.

Howard Haycraft, in his 1941 work, Murder for Pleasure, included the novel in his "cornerstones" list of the most influential crime novels ever written.

Robert Barnard, in A Talent to Deceive: An appreciation of Agatha Christie, wrote that this novel is "Apart—and it is an enormous 'apart'—from the sensational solution, this is a fairly conventional Christie." He concluded that this is "A classic, but there are some better [novels by] Christie."

John Goddard produced a thorough analysis of whether Christie 'cheats' with her sensational solution and concluded that the charge of cheating fails.

Laura Thompson, Christie's biographer, wrote that this is the ultimate detective novel:
The Murder of Roger Ackroyd is the supreme, the ultimate detective novel. It rests upon the most elegant of all twists, the narrator who is revealed to be the murderer. This twist is not merely a function of plot: it puts the whole concept of detective fiction on an armature and sculpts it into a dazzling new shape. It was not an entirely new idea ... nor was it entirely her own idea ... but here, she realised, was an idea worth having. And only she could have pulled it off so completely. Only she had the requisite control, the willingness to absent herself from the authorial scene and let her plot shine clear.

In 1944–1946, the American literary critic Edmund Wilson attacked the entire mystery genre in a set of three columns in The New Yorker. The second, in the 20 January 1945 issue, was titled "Who Cares Who Killed Roger Ackroyd?", though he does no analysis of the novel. He dislikes mystery stories altogether, and chose the famous novel as the title of his piece.

Pierre Bayard, literature professor and author, in Qui a tué Roger Ackroyd? (Who Killed Roger Ackroyd?), re-investigates Agatha Christie's Ackroyd, proposing an alternative solution in another crime novel. He argues in favour of a different murderer – Sheppard's sister, Caroline – and says Christie subconsciously knew who the real culprit is.

In 1990, The Murder of Roger Ackroyd came in at fifth place in The Top 100 Crime Novels of All Time, a ranking by the members (all crime writers) of the Crime Writers' Association in Britain. A similar ranking was made in 1995 by the Mystery Writers of America, putting this novel in twelfth place.

In 1999 the novel was included in Le Monde's 100 Books of the Century published in the French newspaper Le Monde, chosen by readers from a list of 200.

In 2013, the Crime Writers' Association voted this novel as CWA Best Ever Novel. The 600 members of CWA said it was "the finest example of the genre ever penned." It is a cornerstone of crime fiction, which "contains one of the most celebrated plot twists in crime writing history." The poll taken on the 60th anniversary of CWA also honoured Agatha Christie as the best crime novel author ever.

In the "Binge!" article of Entertainment Weekly Issue #1343–44 (26 December 2014 – 3 January 2015), the writers picked The Murder of Roger Ackroyd as an "EW and Christie favorite" on the list of the "Nine Great Christie Novels".

The character of Caroline Sheppard was later acknowledged by Christie as a possible precursor to her famous detective Miss Marple.

Development

Christie revealed in her 1977 autobiography that the basic idea of the novel was given to her by her brother-in-law, James Watts of Abney Hall, who suggested a novel in which the criminal would be a Dr Watson character, which Christie considered to be a "remarkably original thought".

In March 1924 Christie also received an unsolicited letter from Lord Mountbatten. He had been impressed with her previous works and wrote, courtesy of The Sketch magazine (publishers of many of her short stories at that time) with an idea and notes for a story whose basic premise mirrored the Watts suggestion. Christie acknowledged the letter and after some thought, began to write the book but to a plot line of her invention. She also acknowledged taking inspiration from the infamous case of the unsolved death of Charles Bravo, who she thought had been murdered by Dr James Manby Gully.

In December 1969 Mountbatten wrote to Christie again after having seen a performance of The Mousetrap. He mentioned his letter of the 1920s, and Christie replied, acknowledging the part he played in the conception of the book.

Publication history

 1926, William Collins and Sons (London), June 1926, Hardback, 312 pp (Seven shillings and sixpence)
 1926, Dodd Mead and Company (New York), 19 June 1926, Hardback, 306 pp ($2.00)
 1927, William Collins and Sons (Popular Edition), March 1927, Hardback (Three shillings and sixpence)
 1928, William Collins and Sons (Cheap Edition), February 1928 (One shilling)
 1932, William Collins and Sons, February 1932 (in the Agatha Christie Omnibus of Crime along with The Mystery of the Blue Train, The Seven Dials Mystery, and The Sittaford Mystery), Hardback (Seven shillings and sixpence)
 1939, Canterbury Classics (William Collins and Sons), Illustrated hardback, 336 pp
 1939, Pocket Books (New York), Paperback (Pocket number 5), 212 pp
 1948, Penguin Books, Paperback (Penguin 684), 250 pp
 1957, Fontana Books (Imprint of HarperCollins), Paperback, 254 pp
 1964, Modern Author series (William Collins and Sons), Hardback, 254 pp
 1967, Greenway edition of collected works (William Collins and Sons/Dodd Mead), Hardback, 288 pp
 1972, Ulvercroft Large-print Edition, Hardback, 414pp 
 2006, Poirot Facsimile Edition (Facsimile of 1926 UK First Edition), HarperCollins, 4 September 2006, Hardback 

The novel received its first true publication as a fifty-four part serialisation in the London Evening News from Thursday, 16 July, to Wednesday, 16 September 1925, under the title, Who Killed Ackroyd?  Like that paper's serialisation of The Man in the Brown Suit, there were minor amendments to the text, mostly to make sense of the openings of an instalment (e.g., changing "He then..." to "Poirot then..."). The main change was that the book has twenty-seven chapters whereas the serialisation has only twenty-four. Chapter Seven of the serialisation is named The Secrets of the Study whereas in the book it is Chapter Eight and named Inspector Raglan is Confident.

In the US, the novel was serialised in four parts in Flynn's Detective Weekly from 19 June (Volume 16, Number 2) to 10 July 1926 (Volume 16, Number 5). The text was heavily abridged and each instalment carried an uncredited illustration.

The Collins first edition of 1926 was Christie's first work placed with that publisher. "The first book that Agatha wrote for Collins was the one that changed her reputation forever; no doubt she knew, as through 1925 she turned the idea over in her mind, that here she had a winner." HarperCollins, the modern successor firm to W. Collins Sons & Co. Ltd., remains the UK publishers of Christie's oeuvre.

By 1928, The Murder of Roger Ackroyd was available in braille through the Royal National Institute for the Blind and was among the first works to be chosen for transfer to Gramophone record for their Books for the Blind library in the autumn of 1935. By 1936 it was listed as one of only eight books available in this form.

In 2022, the book entered the public domain in the United States.

Book dedication

Christie's dedication in the book reads:

To Punkie, who likes an orthodox detective story, murder, inquest, and suspicion falling on every one in turn!

"Punkie" was the family nickname of Christie's sister and eldest sibling, Margaret ("Madge") Frary Watts (1879–1950). Despite their eleven-year age gap, the sisters remained close throughout their lives. Christie's mother first suggested to her that she should alleviate the boredom of an illness by writing a story. But soon after, when the sisters had been discussing the recently published classic detective story by Gaston Leroux, The Mystery of the Yellow Room  (1908), Christie said she would like to try writing such a story. Margaret challenged her, saying that she would not be able to do it. In 1916, eight years later, Christie remembered this conversation and was inspired to write her first novel, The Mysterious Affair at Styles.

Margaret Watts wrote a play, The Claimant, based on the Tichborne Case, which enjoyed a short run in the West End at the Queen's Theatre from 11 September to 18 October 1924, two years before the book publication of The Murder of Roger Ackroyd.

Dustjacket blurb
The dustjacket blurb read as follows:
M. Poirot, the hero of The Mysterious Affair at Stiles  and other brilliant pieces of detective deduction, comes out of his temporary retirement like a giant refreshed, to undertake the investigation of a peculiarly brutal and mysterious murder. Geniuses like Sherlock Holmes often find a use for faithful mediocrities like Dr Watson, and by a coincidence it is the local doctor who follows Poirot round, and himself tells the story. Furthermore, as seldom happens in these cases, he is instrumental in giving Poirot one of the most valuable clues to the mystery.

In popular culture
Gilbert Adair's 2006 locked-room mystery The Act of Roger Murgatroyd was written as "a celebration-cum-critique-cum-parody" of The Murder of Roger Ackroyd.

Adaptations

Stage play

The book formed the basis of the earliest adaptation of any work of Christie's when the play, Alibi, adapted by Michael Morton, opened at the Prince of Wales Theatre in London on 15 May 1928. It ran for 250 performances with Charles Laughton as Poirot. Laughton also starred in the Broadway run of the play, retitled The Fatal Alibi, which opened at the Booth Theatre on 8 February 1932. The American production was not as successful and closed after just 24 performances. 
Alibi inspired Christie to write her first stage play, Black Coffee. Christie, with her dog Peter, attended the rehearsals of Alibi and found its "novelty" enjoyable. However, "she was sufficiently irritated by the changes to the original to want to write a play of her own."

Film

The play was turned into the first sound film based on a Christie work. Running 75 minutes, it was released on 28 April 1931, by Twickenham Film Studios and produced by Julius S. Hagan. Austin Trevor played Poirot, a role he reprised later that year in the film adaptation of Christie's 1930 play, Black Coffee. Alibi is considered to be a lost film.

In 2002, the story was made into a Russian film titled Неудача Пуаро ("Neudacha Puaro" = "Poirot's Failure"). This film version was overall quite faithful to the original story.

Cast:
Konstantin Raikin as Hercule Poirot
Sergei Makovetsky as Dr Sheppard
Lika Nifontova as Caroline Sheppard
Olga Krasko as Flora

Radio 

Orson Welles adapted the novel as a one-hour radio play for the 12 November 1939 episode of The Campbell Playhouse. Welles played both Dr Sheppard and Hercule Poirot. The play was adapted by Herman J. Mankiewicz, produced by Welles and John Houseman, and directed by Welles.

Cast:
Orson Welles as Hercule Poirot and Dr Sheppard
Edna May Oliver as Caroline Sheppard
Alan Napier as Roger Ackroyd
Brenda Forbes as Mrs Ackroyd
Mary Taylor as Flora
George Coulouris as Inspector Hamstead
Ray Collins as Mr Raymond
Everett Sloane as Parker

The novel was also adapted as a 1½-hour radio play for BBC Radio 4 first broadcast on 24 December 1987. John Moffatt made the first of his many performances as Poirot. The adaptation was broadcast at 7.45pm and was recorded on 2 November of the same year; it was adapted by Michael Bakewell and produced by Enyd Williams.

Cast:
John Moffatt as Hercule Poirot
John Woodvine as Doctor Sheppard
Laurence Payne as Roger Ackroyd
Diana Olsson as Caroline Sheppard
Eva Stuart as Miss Russell
Peter Gilmore as Raymond
Zelah Clarke as Flora
Simon Cuff as Inspector Davis
Deryck Guyler as Parker
With Richard Tate, Alan Dudley, Joan Matheson, David Goodland, Peter Craze, Karen Archer and Paul Sirr

TelevisionThe Murder of Roger Ackroyd was adapted as a 103-minute drama transmitted in the UK on ITV Sunday 2 January 2000, as a special episode in their series, Agatha Christie's Poirot. In this adaptation Japp – not Sheppard – is Poirot's assistant, leaving Sheppard as just another suspect. However, the device of Dr Sheppard's journal is retained as the supposed source of Poirot's voice-over narration and forms an integral part of the dénouement. The plot strays considerably from the book, including having Sheppard run over Parker numerous times with his car and commit suicide with his gun after a chase through a factory. Ackroyd was changed to a more elderly, stingy man, disliked by many, who owns a chemical factory. Mrs Ackroyd, the sister-in-law of Roger Ackroyd, is also not as zany as in the book version. Location filming took place at Castle Combe in Wiltshire.

Adaptor: Clive Exton
Director: Andrew Grieve

Cast:

David Suchet as Hercule Poirot
Philip Jackson as Chief Inspector Japp
Oliver Ford Davies as Dr Sheppard
Selina Cadell as Caroline Sheppard
Roger Frost as Parker
Malcolm Terris as Roger Ackroyd
Nigel Cooke as Geoffrey Raymond
Daisy Beaumont as Ursula Bourne
Flora Montgomery as Flora Ackroyd
Vivien Heilbron as Mrs Ackroyd
Gregor Truter as Inspector Davis
Jamie Bamber as Ralph Paton
Charles Early as Constable Jones
Rosalind Bailey as Mrs Ferrars
Charles Simon as Hammond
Graham Chinn as Landlord
Clive Brunt as Naval petty officer
Alice Hart as Mary
Philip Wrigley as Postman
Phil Atkinson as Ted
Elizabeth Kettle as Mrs FolliottThe Murder of Roger Ackroyd was adapted as a 190-minute drama transmitted in Japan on Fuji Television on April 14, 2018, as a special drama, under the title "The Murder of Kuroido" (Kuroido Goroshi).

Adaptor: Koki Mitani
Director: Hidenori Joho

Cast:

Mansai Nomura as Takeru Suguro, based on Hercule Poirot
Yo Oizumi as Heisuke Shiba, based on James Sheppard
Yuki Saito as Kana Shiba, based on Caroline Sheppard
Takashi Fujii as Jiro Hakamada, based on John Parker
Kenichi Endō as Rokusuke Kuroido, based on Roger Ackroyd
Mayu Matsuoka as Hanako Kuroido, based on Flora Ackroyd
Tamiyo Kusakari as Mitsuru Kuroido, based on Cecil Ackroyd
Osamu Mukai as Haruo Hyodo, based on Ralph Paton
Yasufumi Terawaki as Moichi Reizei, based on Geoffrey Raymond
Tomohiko Imai as Goro Rando, based on Hector Blunt
Kimiko Yo as Tsuneko Raisen, based on Elizabeth Russell
Sayaka Akimoto as Asuka Honda, based on Ursula Bourne
Jiro Sato as Koshiro Sodetake, based on Inspector Raglan
Yo Yoshida as Sanako Karatsu, based on Mrs Ferrars
Kazuyuki Asano as Hamose, based on Mr Hammond
Masato Wada as Kenzo Chagawa, based on Charles Kent

Graphic novel The Murder of Roger Ackroyd was released by HarperCollins as a graphic novel adaptation on 20 August 2007, adapted and illustrated by Bruno Lachard. This was translated from the edition first published in France by Emmanuel Proust éditions in 2004 under the title, Le Meurtre de Roger Ackroyd''.

See also
Le Monde 100 Books of the Century
The Shooting Party (Chekhov novel)

References

Further reading

External links

 
 

The Murder of Roger Ackroyd at the official Agatha Christie website

1926 British novels
Hercule Poirot novels
Fiction with unreliable narrators
Novels first published in serial form
Works originally published in The Evening News (London newspaper)
William Collins, Sons books
British novels adapted into films
British novels adapted into television shows
First-person narrative novels